White Lightnin' is a 2009 dramatic film directed by Dominic Murphy and written by Eddy Moretti and Shane Smith. It stars Edward Hogg, Carrie Fisher, Muse Watson. Inspired by the life of Jesco White, an Appalachian mountain dancer, it was shown at the 2009 Sundance Film Festival.

Plot
Jesco White (Edward Hogg) is the last of the West Virginia mountain dancers. He is the son of D. Ray White (Muse Watson), the greatest mountain dancer of all time. Ever since Jesco was a child, D. Ray tried to keep him on a straight path—one that would put him on the right hand of the Lord. Dancing was just one way to keep Jesco from losing his soul. But from a young age, there was temptation drawing him away from D. Ray, away from the dancing. There were the voices in his head, tormenting him. Maybe that is why Jesco loved to get high.

Hooked on sniffing gas, glue, lighter fluid, and airplane cement, Jesco was constantly finding himself in trouble with the law. He landed in the reform school more than once, and it was here that he spent most of his adolescence, left to endure the horror of the voices.

Years after his time in reform school, Jesco had made the best of staying true to his daddy's word. He tried to stay as straight as he could, and used the dancing to do so. But the devil has his ways too, and soon Jesco was back to his old vices. On his way around the south, dancing and performing in whatever local dives he could, Jesco met the woman of his dreams—four-foot three-inch Enid Carter (Carrie Fisher). Jesco renames her Percilla. An off-beat pair, the two managed to keep all their wickedness inside the family.

Long and Davie—the two men responsible for dragging D. Ray years earlier behind their pickup until he was dead, are released from prison because of a trial error. It was as though God were testing Jesco again, tempting him with the taste of revenge. And so this temptation is satisfied, and Jesco got the revenge he craved, brutally torturing and murdering the two. After accidentally killing the officer who comes to arrest Jesco, he takes to the woods. Jesco hid himself in the cabin deep in the West Virginia hills previously inhabited by the preacher, whose voice Jesco constantly hears in his head. Jesco encounters God, cutting and chopping himself until he dies to expiate himself of his sins.

Cast
 Edward Hogg as Jesco White
Owen Campbell as Young Jesco White
 Carrie Fisher as Cilla
 Kirk Bovill as Long
 Muse Watson as D. Ray White

Gallery

Production
White Lightnin''' was filmed with a $2 million budget. Although the story takes place in West Virginia it was mostly filmed in Croatia, though additional shooting was done in West Virginia.<ref name=Variety>Thomas, Archie (29 October 2007). [https://www.variety.com/article/VR1117974917.html?categoryid=13&cs=1 "Ed Hogg steps into White Lightnin'"]. Variety. Retrieved 9 September 2010.</ref>

ReceptionWhite Lightnin' ''received positive reviews from critics receiving an 81% based of 16 reviews on Rotten Tomatoes.

Awards
 Golden Gateway of India Award 11th Mumbai Film Festival 2009
 "Golden Hitchcock" at the Dinard Festival of British Film, 2009
 Fantasia Festival "Jury Prize for Best First Feature"
 British Independent Film Awards Most Promising Newcomer for Edward Hogg

References

External links

Vice Films films
2009 films
British drama films
Films shot in Croatia
Films set in Appalachia
2000s English-language films
2000s British films